Niels Wisløff Rogstad (1814–1880) was a Norwegian civil servant and lawyer.  He served as the County Governor of Nedenæs county from 1863 until 1868. After his time as governor, he was appointed the bailiff of Hedmark from 1868 until 1880.

References

1814 births
1880 deaths
County governors of Norway